Lyudmila Filimonova (born 22 March 1971) is a retired Belarusian discus thrower. Her personal best throw was 64.44 metres, achieved in May 1998 in Minsk.

She finished eighth at the 1994 European Championships in Helsinki and the 1995 World Championships in Gothenburg.

Achievements

External links

1971 births
Living people
Belarusian female discus throwers
Athletes (track and field) at the 1996 Summer Olympics
Olympic athletes of Belarus